The State Symphony Orchestra of Turkmenistan (SSOT) is based in Ashgabat, Turkmenistan. The State Symphony Orchestra of Turkmenistan was founded on the initiative and under the patronage of the President of Turkmenistan in 2008.

History 
The orchestra has included famous musicians, laureates of international and national competitions, and talented young graduates of the Turkmen National Conservatory.

The first concert of the State Symphony Orchestra of Turkmenistan, conducted by Meritorious Artist Orazgeldi Berdiyev, was held in February 2008. The concert program was consisted of works by prominent Turkmen and foreign composers.

Principal conductors 
 Orazgeldi Berdiyev (2008–?)
 Rasul Klychev (?–incumbent)

References

Symphony orchestras
Musical groups established in 2008
2008 establishments in Turkmenistan